Sedric Clark (born January 28, 1973) is a former professional American football linebacker who played in the National Football League, NFL Europe and the XFL. In his five-year pro career he played for the Baltimore Ravens of the NFL, the Frankfurt Galaxy and Berlin Thunder of NFL Europe, and the Orlando Rage of the XFL. Clark played college football at the University of Tulsa.

Professional career

Oakland Raiders
Clark was selected by the Oakland Raiders in the seventh round (220th overall) of the 1996 NFL Draft.

References

1973 births
Living people
People from Missouri City, Texas
American football defensive ends
American football linebackers
Tulsa Golden Hurricane football players
Oakland Raiders players
Jacksonville Jaguars players
Baltimore Ravens players
Carolina Panthers players
Frankfurt Galaxy players
Berlin Thunder players
Orlando Rage players
Players of American football from Texas
Sportspeople from Harris County, Texas